was a village located in Yame District, Fukuoka Prefecture, Japan.

As of 2003, the village had an estimated population of 3,707 and a density of 45.61 persons per km². The total area was 81.28 km².

On February 1, 2010, Hoshino, along with the towns of Kurogi and Tachibana, and the village of Yabe (all from Yame District), was merged into the expanded city of Yame.

See also
The Most Beautiful Villages in Japan

External links
 Yame official website 

Dissolved municipalities of Fukuoka Prefecture
Populated places disestablished in 2010